The following lists the number one rock singles in Canada in 2005 based on airplay from Mediabase which was published in Radio & Records magazine.

Chart history

References

Canada Rock Singles